The Turkmen people have traditionally been nomads and equestrians, and even today after the fall of the USSR attempts to urbanize the Turkmens have not been very successful. They never really formed a coherent nation or ethnic group until they were forged into one by Joseph Stalin in the 1930s. Rather they are divided into clans, and each clan has its own dialect and style of dress. Turkmens are famous for making knotted Turkmen carpets, often mistakenly called "Bukhara rugs" in the West. These are elaborate and colorful hand-knotted carpets, and these too help indicate the distinctions among the various Turkmen clans.

The Turkmens are Sunni Muslims but they, like most of the region's nomads, adhere to Islam. 

A Turkmen man can be identified anywhere by the traditional "telpek" hats, which are large black or white sheepskin hats that resemble afros. Traditional dress for men consists of high, shaggy sheepskin hats and red robes over white shirts. Women wear long sack-dresses over narrow trousers (the pants are trimmed with a band of embroidery at the ankle). Female headdresses usually consist of silver jewelry. Bracelets and brooches are set with semi-precious stones.

History

Language
Outside the capital, the national language of Turkmen is the most widely encountered. In Ashgabat and Türkmenbaşy, the Russian is commonly encountered, but with recent efforts to revive the ancient culture of Turkmenistan, Turkmen is quickly regaining its place as the chief language of the state.

Literature
Two significant figures in traditional Turkmen literature are the poets Magtymguly Pyragy and Mämmetweli Kemine.

Theatre 
There are 10 state theaters in Turkmenistan: 5 in Ashgabat and 5 in regional centers.

Music

Turkmen music is very similar to Khorasani music.

Heritage sites

Gallery

See also
 Akhal-Teke horse
 Yomut carpet
 Turkmen carpet
 Islam in Turkmenistan
 Merv
 Turkmen cuisine
 Turkmen jewelry

References

Further reading

External links

 Official state web-site dedicated to the culture of Turkmenistan
 Turkmenistan Culture-Lonely Planet